In linear algebra, a sublinear function (or functional as is more often used in functional analysis), also called a quasi-seminorm or a Banach functional, on a vector space  is a real-valued function with only some of the properties of a seminorm. Unlike seminorms, a sublinear function does not have to be nonnegative-valued and also does not have to be absolutely homogeneous. Seminorms are themselves abstractions of the more well known notion of norms, where a seminorm has all the defining properties of a norm  that it is not required to map non-zero vectors to non-zero values. 

In functional analysis the name Banach functional is sometimes used, reflecting that they are most commonly used when applying a general formulation of the Hahn–Banach theorem. 
The notion of a sublinear function was introduced by Stefan Banach when he proved his version of the Hahn-Banach theorem.

There is also a different notion in computer science, described below, that also goes by the name "sublinear function."

Definitions

Let  be a vector space over a field  where  is either the real numbers  or complex numbers  
Positive homogeneity/Nonnegative homogeneity:  for all real  and all 
 This condition holds if and only if  for all positive real  and all 
Subadditivity/Triangle inequality:  for all 
 This subadditivity condition requires  to be real-valued.

A function  is called  or  if  for all  
It is a  if  for all  
Every subadditive symmetric function is necessarily nonnegative. 
A sublinear function on a real vector space is symmetric if and only if it is a seminorm. 
A sublinear function on a real or complex vector space is a seminorm if and only if it is a balanced function or equivalently, if and only if  for every unit length scalar  (satisfying ) and every  

The set of all sublinear functions on  denoted by  can be partially ordered by declaring  if and only if  for all  
A sublinear function is called  if it is a minimal element of  under this order. 
A sublinear function is minimal if and only if it is a real linear functional.

Examples and sufficient conditions

Every norm, seminorm, and real linear functional is a sublinear function. 
More generally, for any real  the map 

A function  is sublinear if and only if it is subadditive, convex, and satisfies

Properties

Every sublinear function is a convex function: For 

If  is a sublinear function on a vector space  then
 

Subadditivity of  guarantees that for all vectors 

so if  is also symmetric then the reverse triangle inequality will hold for all vectors 

Adding  to both sides of the hypothesis  (where ) and combining that with the conclusion gives 
 
which yields many more inequalities, including, for instance,
 

Associated seminorm

If  is a real-valued sublinear function on a real vector space  (or if  is complex, then when it is considered as a real vector space) then the map  defines a seminorm on the real vector space  called the seminorm associated with  
A sublinear function  on a real or complex vector space is a symmetric function if and only if  where  as before. 

More generally, if  is a real-valued sublinear function on a (real or complex) vector space  then 
 
will define a seminorm on  if this supremum is always a real number (that is, never equal to ).

Relation to linear functionals

If  is a sublinear function on a real vector space  then the following are equivalent: 
 is a linear functional.
for every  
for every  
 is a minimal sublinear function.

If  is a sublinear function on a real vector space  then there exists a linear functional  on  such that 

Dominating a linear functional

A real-valued function  defined on a subset of a real or complex vector space  is said to be  a sublinear function  if  for every  that belongs to the domain of  
Moreover, if  is a seminorm or some other  (which by definition means that  holds for all ) then  if and only if

Continuity

Then the following are equivalent: 
 is continuous;
 is continuous at 0;
and if  is positive then this list may be extended to include:
 is open in 

Relation to Minkowski functions and open convex sets

Relation to open convex sets

Operators

The concept can be extended to operators that are homogeneous and subadditive. 
This requires only that the codomain be, say, an ordered vector space to make sense of the conditions.

Computer science definition

Formally,  if and only if, for any given  there exists an  such that  for 
That is,  grows slower than any linear function.
The two meanings should not be confused: while a Banach functional is convex, almost the opposite is true for functions of sublinear growth: every function  can be upper-bounded by a concave function of sublinear growth.

See also

Notes

References

Bibliography

  
  
  
  
  

Articles containing proofs
Functional analysis
Linear algebra
Types of functions